Air Kasaï is an airline with its head office on the property of N'Dolo Airport in Barumbu, Kinshasa, Democratic Republic of the Congo. It operates charter services within Africa. Its main base is N'Dolo Airport, Kinshasa.

The airline is banned from operating in the European Union.

History
The airline was established in 1983 and was formerly known as Transport Aérien Congo (TAC) and Transport Aérien Zaïrois (TAZ). It is a Swedish owned company.

In March 2006, Air Kasaï was officially banned from operating in the whole EU, plus Norway and Switzerland.

Destinations
Air Kasaï serves the following destinations (as of April 2012):

Fleet

The Air Kasaï fleet consists of the following aircraft (as of April 2014):

Media
In March 2014, Air Kasaï was featured in the Vice News episode "Russian Pilots of the Congo".

Incidents and accidents
 On 9 September 2005, an Air Kasaï Antonov An-26B crashed in the Republic of the Congo 50 kilometers (31 miles) north of Brazzaville, killing all 13 people (four crew members and nine passengers) on board.
 On 27 July 2018, an Antonov An-2 crashed on take-off from an airstrip near Kamako, killing five of seven occupants.

See also		
 Transport in the Democratic Republic of the Congo

References

External links
 

Airlines of the Democratic Republic of the Congo
Airlines established in 1983
Companies based in Kinshasa